Vigen (Vagharshak) Chaldranyan (born 26 December 1955 in Yerevan) is an Armenian Film Director, Screenwriter, Editor, Actor, Art Director, and Producer.

Education and career
 1977 - graduated from the Yerevan Fine Arts and Theatre Institute. 
 1981 - graduated from the VGIK (Yefim Dzigan's master-class).

Career
 1981-85 - worked in the theatre. 
 Since 1988 - a film director at Armenfilm Studio. Starring in many films.

Filmography

References

External links

 

Armenian male film actors
Armenian film directors
Armenian film producers
Armenian film editors
21st-century Armenian screenwriters
Living people
1955 births
Male actors from Yerevan
Film people from Yerevan
20th-century Armenian male actors
21st-century Armenian male actors